Otto Josef Hofer (born 28 June 1944) is a Swiss equestrian. He won an individual bronze medal at the 1984 Summer Olympics in Los Angeles, and a silver medal with the Swiss team. He won a silver medal with the Swiss team at the 1988 Summer Olympics in Seoul.

References

1944 births
Living people
Olympic silver medalists for Switzerland
Olympic bronze medalists for Switzerland
Equestrians at the 1984 Summer Olympics
Equestrians at the 1988 Summer Olympics
Equestrians at the 1992 Summer Olympics
Olympic equestrians of Switzerland
Swiss male equestrians
Swiss dressage riders
Olympic medalists in equestrian
Medalists at the 1988 Summer Olympics
Medalists at the 1984 Summer Olympics
20th-century Swiss people